A Cure for Suffragettes is a 1913 American silent comedy film. It was written by Anita Loos and directed by Edward Dillon for Biograph Company. It stars Dorothy Bernard, Kathleen Butler, and Dorothy Gish.

Plot

References

External links 
 
 

1913 films